Owensboro is a city in the U.S. state of Kentucky. "Owensboro" may also refer to:

Owensboro Bridge
Owensboro Catholic High School
Owensboro Community and Technical College
Owensboro–Daviess County Regional Airport
Owensboro High School
Owensboro Medical Health System Hospital
Owensboro metropolitan area
Owensboro and Nashville Railroad
Owensboro and Nashville Railway
Owensboro Oilers
Owensboro Public Schools
Owensboro Rage
Owensboro and Russellville Railroad
Owensboro Sportscenter
Central City, Kentucky, formerly "Owensboro Junction."
Evansville IceMen, once "Owensboro IceMen." 
Evansville, Owensboro and Nashville Railroad